Rasoul Motamedi  (born 9 November 1998) is an Iranian weightlifter. He won the gold medal in the men's 102 kg event at the 2021 World Weightlifting Championships held in Tashkent, Uzbekistan. He also won a gold medal at the 2020 Asian Weightlifting Championships in the 102 kg weight division.

He won the gold medal in the men's 109kg event at the 2022 Asian Weightlifting Championships held in Manama, Bahrain. He was unable to compete at the 2022 World Weightlifting Championships due to injury.

Major results

References

External links

 

1998 births
Living people
Iranian male weightlifters
World Weightlifting Championships medalists
21st-century Iranian people
Islamic Solidarity Games competitors for Iran